Natalia Viktorovna Mashina ( born 28 March 1997) is a Russian footballer. She plays as forward for Fatih Karagümrük in the Turkish Women's Football Super League, as well as the Russia women's national football team.

Personal life 
Natalia Mashina was born in Moscow, Russia on 28 March 1997. She studied at the Russian State Social University in Moscow.

Club career 
Mashina began to play football in the Youth Sports School of "Savyolovsky  No. 75". She played iin her country for CSP Izmailovo (2014), WFC Rossiyanka (2014–2015), ZFK CSKA Moscow (2016–2020), ZFK Zenit Saint Petersburg (2020–2021) and WFC Lokomotiv Moscow (2022).

Mid January 2023, she moved to Turkey, and signed with the Istanbul-based Super League club Fatih Karagümrük .

International career 
Mashina played for the Russia U-17 team between 2014. She was a member of the Russia U-19 team in 2016. She was then admitted to the Russia women's  team şn the years 2017 and 2021–2022. She enjoyed the national team's bronze medal won at the 2017 Summer Universiade in Taipei, Taiwan. The same year, she played at the Algarve Cup. She was a member of the national team, wh
ch beame runners-up at the 2022 Pinatar Cup.

References 

1997 births
Living people
Footballers from Moscow
Russian State Social University alumni
Russian women's footballers
Women's association football forwards
Russia women's international footballers
Medalists at the 2017 Summer Universiade
CSP Izmailovo players
WFC Rossiyanka players
ZFK CSKA Moscow players
ZFK Zenit Saint Petersburg players
WFC Lokomotiv Moscow players
Russian expatriate footballers
Expatriate women's footballers in Turkey
Russian expatriate sportspeople in Turkey
Turkish Women's Football Super League players
Fatih Karagümrük S.K. (women's football) players